The 2019 Kentucky Bank Tennis Championships was a professional tennis tournament played on outdoor hard courts. It was the 24th (ATP) and 22nd (ITF) editions of the tournament and was part of the 2019 ATP Challenger Tour and the 2019 ITF Women's World Tennis Tour. It took place in Lexington, the United States, from 29 July–to 4 August 2019.

Men's singles main draw entrants

Seeds 

 1 Rankings as of 22 July 2019.

Other entrants 
The following players received a wildcard into the singles main draw:
  Ezekiel Clark
  Ronald Hohmann
  Toby Alex Kodat
  Nicolas Moreno de Alboran
  Enzo Wallart

The following player received entry into the singles main draw as a special exempt:
  Peter Polansky

The following players received entry into the singles main draw as alternates:
  Sem Verbeek
  Alexey Zakharov

The following players received entry into the singles main draw using their ITF World Tennis Ranking:
  Diego Hidalgo
  Evan Hoyt
  Strong Kirchheimer
  Michail Pervolarakis
  Colin Sinclair

The following players received entry from the qualifying draw:
  Vasil Kirkov
  Keegan Smith

The following player received entry as a lucky loser:
  Alexander Lebedev

Women's singles main draw entrants

Seeds 

 1 Rankings as of 22 July 2019

Other entrants 
The following players received a wildcard into the singles main draw:
  Katharine Fahey
  Justina Mikulskytė

The following players received entry from the qualifying draw:
  Angelina Gabueva
  Kim Da-bin
  Verena Meliss
  Alycia Parks
  Peyton Stearns
  Emily Webley-Smith

Champions

Men's singles

 Jannik Sinner def.  Alex Bolt 6–4, 3–6, 6–4.

Women's singles

 Kim Da-bin def.  Ann Li, 6–1, 6–3

Men's doubles

 Diego Hidalgo /  Martin Redlicki def.  Roberto Maytín /  Jackson Withrow 6–2, 6–2.

Women's doubles

 Robin Anderson /  Jessika Ponchet def.  Ann Li /  Jamie Loeb, 7–6(7–4), 6–7(5–7), [10–7]

References

External links 
 Official website
 Kentucky Bank Tennis Championships at ITFtennis.com

2019 ITF Women's World Tennis Tour
Kentucky Bank Tennis Championships
2019 in American tennis
2019
July 2019 sports events in the United States
August 2019 sports events in the United States